Withanaarchchige Chamara Akalanka Ganegama (born 29 March 1981), Akalanka Ganegama is a former Sri Lankan ODI cricketer, and currently a TV presenter, dancer, actor and a singer by profession.

He is a right-handed batsman and a right-arm medium-fast bowler who played in two One Day Internationals for Sri Lanka and has also played Twenty20 and List A cricket. He played domestic cricket for Nondescripts and currently for Chilaw Marians.

Beyond cricket
Currently he is also working as an actor, and a dancer. He won "Sirasa Dancing Stars – season 2" competition held on 2008. He also sang a single song, named "Harima Hadai" with feat Iraj and Clews.

Personal life
Ganegame is married to his long time partner Shashini Ganegama. The wedding was celebrated on 12 August 2016.

Filmography

References

1981 births
Living people
Alumni of Ananda College
Sri Lankan cricketers
Sri Lanka One Day International cricketers
Chilaw Marians Cricket Club cricketers
North Central Province cricketers
Kandurata cricketers
Nondescripts Cricket Club cricketers
Colombo Cricket Club cricketers
21st-century Sri Lankan male actors